The 1938 New Mexico gubernatorial election took place on November 8, 1938, in order to elect the Governor of New Mexico. Incumbent Democrat Clyde Tingley was term-limited, and could not run for reelection to a third consecutive term.

General election

Results

References

gubernatorial
1938
New Mexico
November 1938 events